James Felder (born May 26, 1971 in Manhattan, New York) is an American teacher, comic book editor, and cartoon writer known for his work in editing Daredevil and in writing for the series Teenage Mutant Ninja Turtles and Chaotic.

Biography

James Felder currently teaches at the Tisch School of the Arts's Dramatic Writing Department at NYU, where he received his Master's Degree in Dramatic Writing. He was awarded Tisch's 2019 David-Payne Carter Excellence in Teaching Award. He has been involved with teaching at the department since he started The Stan-Hattan Project there in 1995.

His writing has been featured on animated series for Cartoon Network on "Generator Rex" and the relaunch of Ben-10, for Disney XD on The Avengers: Earth's Mightiest Heroes and "Ultimate Spider-Man (TV series)", and in syndication on Cyboars (Story Editor/Supervising Producer also) and Teenage Mutant Ninja Turtles.

He currently oversees story development for Black Dragon Entertainment animation studio in Beijing. Monkey King: A Hero's Journey to the West, the first feature of a four movie franchise he is writing for Black Dragon, will be released late 2019.  

He is also an accomplished photographer with many of his photographs appearing on Jones Soda labels.

Since 1990, he has played with the New York University Pipes & Drums, and is one of their founding members and Pipe Sergeant.

He is the son of the attorney Raoul Felder and the nephew of Doc Pomus (Jerome Felder).

Bibliography
Comics work includes:

Deadpool Team-Up (with Pete Woods, one-shot, Marvel Comics, 1998)
Rise of Apocalypse #2-4 (with Adam Pollina, 4-issue mini-series, Marvel Comics, 1996–1997)
Iron Fist Volume 2 #1, 2 (2-issue mini-series, Marvel Comics, 1996)

References

External links

Interviews
Interview with James Felder on Editing Dare Devil

Living people
People from Manhattan
1971 births
Tisch School of the Arts alumni
Tisch School of the Arts faculty